Captain Alfred Stewart Hemming was a World War I flying ace credited with eight aerial victories.

References

South African World War I flying aces
White South African people
Recipients of the Distinguished Flying Cross (United Kingdom)
Year of birth missing
Year of death missing